"I Love You So Much It Hurts" is a song written and recorded by Floyd Tillman in 1948.  His version reached number 6 on the Folk Best Seller charts and spent a total of nineteen weeks on the chart.

Notable cover versions
 In 1948, Jimmy Wakely had his second number one on the Folk Best Seller chart with his version of the song. Wakely's version spent a total of twenty-eight weeks on the chart and four non-consecutive weeks at the top.
 In 1949, the Mills Brothers recorded a version of the song which reached number eight on the Race Records chart and number eight on the pop chart.

Other versions
 Charlie Gracie in 1957
 Patsy Ann Noble in 1960
 Bob Luman in 1960, on the album Let's Think About Livin'''
 Tennessee Ernie Ford in 1961, on the album Tennessee Ernie Ford Looks At Love Patsy Cline in 1961, on the album Patsy Cline Showcase Ray Charles in 1962, on the album Modern Sounds in Country and Western Music George Morgan/Marion Worth in 1964, on the album Slippin' Around Don Gibson in 1968 for his album I Love You So Much It Hurts.
 Andy Williams in 1974 on his album, You Lay So Easy on My Mind R. Stevie Moore in 1986 on his album, Glad Music John Prine in 1995, on the album Lost Dogs and Mixed Blessings Merle Haggard in 2002, on the album The Peer Sessions Madeleine Peyroux in 2013, on the album The Blue Room''

References

1948 songs
Floyd Tillman songs
Charlie Gracie songs
Jimmy Wakely songs